The FIBA Oceania Championship for Men 1978 was the qualifying tournament of FIBA Oceania for the 1978 FIBA World Championship. Australia won the series 2-1 to win its third consecutive Oceania Championship.

Teams that did not enter

Results

References
FIBA Archive

FIBA Oceania Championship
Championship
1978 in New Zealand basketball
1978 in Australian basketball
International basketball competitions hosted by New Zealand
Australia men's national basketball team games
New Zealand men's national basketball team games